Paris La Défense – Une Ville En Concert was a concert held by musician Jean-Michel Jarre on the district of La Défense in Paris on Bastille Day, 14 July, 1990. About 2.5 million people standing in front of the pyramidal stage all the way down to the Arc de Triomphe witnessed this event, setting a new Guinness Book of Records entry for Jarre. The concert was funded by the Mairie de Paris, the Ministry of Culture and a small cluster of high-profile Parisian business concerns. Later, a concert video as well as a photobook of the event were released. 

The show featured new tracks from the Waiting for Cousteau album. The concert is the only time that the track Calypso 2 has been performed live to date. Vast grotesque marionettes created by Trinidadian Peter Minshall were used in the concert, along with a live steel drum band. 

A 50 minute TV edit was produced for broadcast worldwide after the event and a 75 minute edit later released on VHS cassette in 1992. The tracks Equinoxe 5 and Rendez-Vous 4 were not included on the VHS release for unknown reasons, while encore of Calypso 1 was played over a video montage for the end credits. Only camcorder footage exists of these tracks, available on YouTube. 
A DVD release of the VHS edit was mooted by Jarre for a number of years but was eventually dropped. 

An unofficial, broadcast quality, double CD of the entire concert exists and has been traded amongst fans since the event.

Track listing 
 

Songs marked (*) are omitted from the official video release.

Musicians

Instruments used

References

Further reading 
 
 

 

 
1990 in music 
Concerts 
1990 in France 
20th century in Paris
Bastille Day